In chemistry, pyramidal inversion (also umbrella inversion) is a fluxional process in compounds with a pyramidal molecule, such as ammonia (NH3) "turns inside out". It is a rapid oscillation of the atom and substituents, the molecule or ion passing through a planar transition state. For a compound that would otherwise be chiral due to a stereocenter, pyramidal inversion allows its enantiomers to racemize. The general phenomenon of pyramidal inversion applies to many types of molecules, including carbanions, amines, phosphines, arsines, stibines, and sulfoxides.

Energy barrier

The identity of the inverting atom has a dominating influence on the barrier. Inversion of ammonia is rapid at room temperature. In contrast, phosphine (PH3) inverts very slowly at room temperature (energy barrier: 132 kJ/mol). Consequently, amines of the type RR′R"N usually are not optically stable (enantiomers racemize rapidly at room temperature), but P-chiral phosphines are. Appropriately substituted sulfonium salts, sulfoxides, arsines, etc. are also optically stable near room temperature. Steric effects can also influence the barrier.

The ammonia interconversion is rapid at room temperature, inverting 30 billion times per second. Two factors contribute to the rapidity of the inversion: a low energy barrier (24.2 kJ/mol; 5.8 kcal/mol) and a narrow width of the barrier itself, which allows for frequent quantum tunnelling (see below). In contrast, phosphine (PH3) inverts very slowly at room temperature (energy barrier: 132 kJ/mol).

Nitrogen inversion

Pyramidal inversion in nitrogen and amines is known as nitrogen inversion. It is a rapid oscillation of the nitrogen atom and substituents, the nitrogen "moving" through the plane formed by the substituents (although the substituents also move - in the other direction); the molecule passing through a planar transition state. For a compound that would otherwise be chiral due to a nitrogen stereocenter, nitrogen inversion provides a low energy pathway for racemization, usually making chiral resolution impossible.

Quantum effects
Ammonia exhibits a quantum tunnelling due to a narrow tunneling barrier, and not due to thermal excitation. Superposition of two states leads to energy level splitting, which is used in ammonia masers.

Examples
The inversion of ammonia was first detected by microwave spectroscopy in 1934.

In one study the inversion in an aziridine was slowed by a factor of 50 by placing the nitrogen atom in the vicinity of a phenolic alcohol group compared to the oxidized hydroquinone.

The system interconverts by oxidation by oxygen and reduction by sodium dithionite.

Exceptions
Conformational strain and structural rigidity can effectively prevent the inversion of amine groups. Tröger's base analogs (including the Hünlich's base) are examples of compounds whose nitrogen atoms are chirally stable stereocenters and therefore have significant optical activity.

References

Physical chemistry
Stereochemistry
Organic chemistry